Chaska Township was a township in Carver County, Minnesota, United States. The population was 154 at the 2000 census.

Geography

Demographics

As of the census of 2000, there were 154 people, 65 households, and 46 families residing in the township. There were 66 housing units at an average density of 23.1/sq mi (8.9/km). The racial makeup of the township was 100.00% White. 72.4% were of German, 7.9% Irish and 7.9% Norwegian ancestry according to Census 2000.

There were 65 households, out of which 30.8% had children under the age of 18 living with them, 60.0% were married couples living together, 7.7% had a female householder with no husband present, and 29.2% were non-families. 29.2% of all households were made up of individuals, and 12.3% had someone living alone who was 65 years of age or older. The average household size was 2.37 and the average family size was 2.91.

In the township the population was spread out, with 23.4% under the age of 18, 6.5% from 18 to 24, 31.8% from 25 to 44, 22.7% from 45 to 64, and 15.6% who were 65 years of age or older. The median age was 40 years. For every 100 females, there were 87.8 males. For every 100 females age 18 and over, there were 90.3 males.

The median income for a household in the township was $54,375, and the median income for a family was $61,250. Males had a median income of $36,875 versus $31,250 for females. The per capita income for the township was $23,548. None of the families and 2.0% of the population were living below the poverty line, including no under eighteens and 9.1% of those over 64.

Annexation by Chaska
As a result of continuing growth in the Minneapolis-St. Paul area, Chaska Township was annexed by the city of Chaska. The township dissolved on February 11, 2005. The planned development includes housing, two neighborhood retail centers, community parks and an elementary school. The plan is in line with Metropolitan Council desires for "smart growth".

References

Chaska, Minnesota
Defunct townships in Minnesota
Townships in Carver County, Minnesota
Populated places disestablished in 2005
Former populated places in Carver County, Minnesota